Helge Jacobsen (2 January 1915 – 2 August 1974) was a Danish cyclist. He competed in the team pursuit event at the 1936 Summer Olympics.

References

External links
 

1915 births
1974 deaths
Danish male cyclists
Olympic cyclists of Denmark
Cyclists at the 1936 Summer Olympics
Cyclists from Copenhagen